Brahim Karabi (5 September 1933 – 26 August 2018) was a Tunisian sprinter. He competed in the men's 400 metres at the 1960 Summer Olympics.

References

External links
 

1933 births
2018 deaths
Athletes (track and field) at the 1960 Summer Olympics
Tunisian male sprinters
Olympic athletes of Tunisia
Place of birth missing
20th-century Tunisian people